Jan Fjærestad (born 28 February 1954) is a retired Norwegian orienteering competitor and athlete. He is Relay World Champion from 1978 as a member of the Norwegian winning team, as well as having a silver medal from 1976, and bronze medal from 1974. He also obtained silver in the 1974 Individual World Championships.

He is also a marathon runner, winner of the Nordic Championship in 1977, and three times national marathon champion. He also has medals at the Norwegian championships in 5000 metres, 10,000 metres and half marathon. He represented the club Fana IL. Internationally he competed at the 1978 European Championships, the 1983 World Cross Country Championships and the 1983 World Championships, but without any success.

His personal best times were:
3000 metres - 7:57.06 min (1982).
5000 metres - 13:37.2 min (1978).
10,000 metres - 28:25.52 min (1981) - ninth among Norwegian 10,000 m runners.
Half marathon - 1:03:43 hrs (1980).
Marathon - 2:13:31 hrs (1983) - tenth among Norwegian marathon runners.

Achievements
All results regarding marathon, unless stated otherwise

References

1954 births
Living people
Sportspeople from Bergen
Norwegian orienteers
Male orienteers
Norwegian male marathon runners
Norwegian male long-distance runners
Foot orienteers
World Orienteering Championships medalists
20th-century Norwegian people